Ekene Michael Ikenwa (born 14 September 1977, in Lagos) is a Nigerian footballer who last played for Salgaocar SC in the I-League. Ekene plays as a forward.

Notes

Living people
Nigerian footballers
Salgaocar FC players
Expatriate footballers in Indonesia
East Bengal Club players
Expatriate footballers in India
Kuala Muda Naza F.C. players
Nigerian expatriate sportspeople in India
Expatriate footballers in Malaysia
Persib Bandung players
Nigerian expatriates in Malaysia
Association football forwards
Expatriate footballers in Cambodia
Persik Kediri players
1977 births
I-League players
Sportspeople from Lagos
Preah Khan Reach Svay Rieng FC players
Jasper United F.C. players
21st-century Nigerian people